KCHJ (1010 AM "El Gallito 1010") is a radio station that broadcasts a ranchera and Norteño oldies format to the Bakersfield, California, area. Licensed to Delano, California, the station is currently owned by Lotus Communications. Its studios are located in southwest Bakersfield, while its transmitter is located northwest of Delano.

FM Translator
An FM translator simulcasts the main AM broadcasting station; it improves coverage and provides the listener the ability to tune an FM frequency with its inherently improved sound.  The FM translator utilizes only vertical polarization.

History

KCHJ was an outlet for Country Western music in the 1960s and 1970s. It was owned by Charles H. Johnes (pronounced Jones) hence the call letters KCHJ. It was a clear channel station so it had listeners over a large geographical area in Central California, as Mr. "Jones" was fond of pointing out on the air. He was one of the disk jockeys, using the name Gable Herman.

In the early 1960s the station featured an evening program known as "Freeway 99" (California's Freeway 99 ran right through the City of Delano). The Freeway 99 Show, hosted by Gable, featured music from the Easy Listening, Big Band, and Jazz genres such as Bert Kaempfert's "Wonderland by Night."

Charles was a pilot before he died. He died in an auto accident in 1968, and from 1968 until the station was sold in 1991, it was operated and managed by his widow, Jean Johnes. She died in 2009 at the age of 94. Tapes of his program were broadcast on the radio station for many years after he died. Other popular disk jockeys were Bill Lambert, Cousin Rich Allison, Gilbert Oeste, and Todd Welch, better known (as " DJ Sir T). KCHJ Debut  Disco, Funk , Soul &  R&B And Then Rap Music" Was In Late 1978 Dan Bigelow And local Record Store Owner Rueben Mendoza Jr Of Centro  Musical.  Mr. Oeste broadcast a popular Spanish language program and there was also a program called Filipino Ling Ling Dai broadcast in Tagalog and other Filipino languages. There was a studio at the transmission site which was located north west of Delano. A live program called "The Barn Dance" was broadcast on weekends and the public was invited to visit during the show.

The station was put up for sale in 1999, with Lotus Communications acquiring it. The sale was consummated on August 24. In 2000, KCHJ adopted the "El Gallito" format of classic Ranchera and Norteño hits.

From 2016 to 2019, this station was simulcast on 92.1 FM.

References

External links
 

CHJ
CHJ
Radio stations established in 1968
[[Category:Lotus Communications stations]